Goa Medical College (GMC) is a government medical college and hospital in Goa, India. It is one of the oldest medical colleges in Asia.

It is currently an organic institution of the Goa University (GU), being its oldest unit.

History 

Since the last decades of the sixteenth century Goa was known as the "cemetery of the Portuguese", in the expression of the Viceroy Francisco de Távora, 1st Count of Alvor. The unhealthiness of the Old Goa was manifest, given the density of the population, which was accompanied by a lack of hygiene and medical care. Until then, doctors in Portuguese India were rare.

The course of medical education in Goa, therefore, began in 1691, when the "chief physicist" (a name given to doctors appointed as head of public health of a given territory) Manoel Roiz de Sousa began a "Medicine Class of Nova Goa", coming from the request made by the Vice-King of India Rodrigo da Costa, functioning intermittently in the eighteenth century; in 1801, the Portuguese crown decided to establish the "Medicine and Surgery Class", to the care of the chief physicist António José de Miranda e Almeida, graduated in Coimbra. This course worked until 1815, when the doctor left Goa.

However, it was only on 5 November 1842 that the "Medical-Surgical School of Goa" got its definitive start. The institution remained in operation even after 11 December 1851, when, through a ministerial report and annexed decree, the colonial government extinguished some medical schools surviving only that of Goa. During that period, it  produced some 1,327 doctors and 469 pharmacists.

When the military annexation of Goa, undertaken by India in 1961, the School was administered by the University of Bombay.

In 1986, it became under the administration of the Goa University (GU), changing the denomination history "Medical-Surgical School" to "Medical College".

Originally located in the center of Panjim, in a structure of Portuguese origin, it was transferred to the most remote neighborhood of Alto-Bambolim in 1993, being part of the medical-hospital teaching complex of GU.

Organization 
The Institute of Psychiatry and Human Behaviour (Bambolim), the T.B. Cunha and Chest disease hospital (St. Inez), the Rural Health and Training Centre (Mandur-Old Goa) and the Urban Health Centre (St. Cruz) form parts of the Establishment. The college is affiliated to the Goa University and offers the MBBS course alongside several MS and MD courses. Some courses with some super-specializations are also awarded.

Goa Medical College (GMC) and Goa Dental College are located opposite each other on the highway connecting Goa's capital Panjim with its commercial capital, Margao.  A pedestrian subway has been constructed to connect both institutes.

As a part of their compulsory rotational intership in the department of preventive and social medicine, the MBBS interns are also posted  in the Sankhle Community Health Centre for 15 days along with the Junior Residents of the same department.

The current acting Dean of Goa Medical College is Dr. S. M. Banderkar, an orthopedic surgeon.

Admissions
180 MBBS and 60 paramedical seats filled through NEET UG

Post Graduate
It has an intake of 86 seats for PG courses in which 50% is by All India Quota.

Courses offered

UG Course
M.B.B.S. - extending for at least a period of 4 1/2 years followed by 1 year of compulsory rotational internship.

PG Courses

M.D.
Anesthesiology 
Biochemistry 
Dermatology 
Diagnostic radiology
Forensic Medicine  
General Medicine 
Microbiology  
Obstetrics & Gynecology 
Pediatrics  
Pathology  
Pharmacology  
 Physiology  
 Psychiatry  
 Preventive & Social Medicine  
Pulmonary Medicine
radio diagnosis

M.S.
 Anatomy  
 
 Ophthalmology  
 Otolaryngology

P. G. Diploma Courses
 Anesthesia  
 Diagnostic radiology 
 Obstetrics & Gynecology  
 Pediatrics  
 Psychological Medicine 
 Public Health  
 Forensic Medicine  (Not yet recognized by MCI)
 Dermatology & VD  (Not yet recognized by MCI)

Notable alumni
Dr. Froilano de Mello
Dr. Francisco Luís Gomes
Agostinho Fernandes (1932-2015), Goan novelist

See also

 Goa University
 Goa Engineering College

References

External links

College Information in FAIMER Database 
College Information in AVICENNA Directories
College Information in World Directory of Medical Schools

Medical colleges in Goa
Universities and colleges in Goa
Educational institutions established in 1842
Scientific organizations established in 1842
1842 establishments in India
1842 establishments in Portuguese India